SDIF is the Sound Description Interchange Format.

SDIF or S.D.I.F. may also refer to:

 Six Days in Fallujah, a video game by Atomic Games
 Standard Generalized Markup Language, SGML Document Interchange Format (SDIF), ISO 9069:1988